Asherville is a residential area west of central Durban, South Africa. It consists of parts of Sydenham, north of Moses Kotane (Sparks) Road, and west of Felix Dhlamini (Brickfield) Road, and includes parts of Springfield. It is largely an Indian area, and has a municipal swimming pool (the first such facility created for Indians under apartheid segregation).

Asherville was the site of a teachers' training college for Indian teachers, and the King George V Hospital. It was widely suspected that the area was set aside for Indians under the apartheid Group Areas Act as a buffer area to limit exposure of the white population to tuberculosis at the hospital.

References

Suburbs of Durban